Franz Ritter von Jauner (14 November 1831, in Vienna –  23 February 1900, in Vienna) was an Austrian theatre director and opera intendant. He was the subject of a 1940 biographical film Operetta in which he was played by Willi Forst.

References 
 

19th-century Austrian people
Austrian opera managers
Opera managers
Austrian conductors (music)
Male conductors (music)
General Directors of the Vienna State Opera
Music directors of the Vienna State Opera
Austrian knights
Musicians from Vienna
1831 births
1900 deaths
19th-century conductors (music)
1900 suicides
19th-century male musicians